Halvor Egner Granerud (born 29 May 1996) is a Norwegian ski jumper. Granerud won three competitions at the 2022-23 Four Hills Tournament and the Overall. He has won 24 Individual World Cup victories and the overall 2020-21 FIS Ski Jumping World Cup. In Planica, he won a gold & silver medal at the 2020 Ski Flying World Championships. He also achieved his first medal at the World Championships in Oberstdorf 2021 by winning silver in the mixed team Normal Hill.

Career
He debuted in the FIS Ski Jumping World Cup in 2015 and got his best result to win the World Cup event in Kuusamo/Ruka in November 2020. Granerud was part of the team that won the FIS Junior World Championship in 2015, together with Joacim Ødegård Bjøreng, Phillip Sjøen and Johann André Forfang. From the 2018–19 season, he's been a part of the national team.

On 11 February 2016, He set his unofficial personal best in Vikersund as a trial jumper when he jumped 240 metres. Two years later in Planica he set his official personal best at 233 metres.

2020/21 World Cup
On 29 November 2020, Granerud took his first ever World Cup podium by winning in Kuusamo. At the following weekend, Granerud would win both competitions in Nizhny Tagil, gaining enough points for the leader's jersey. In Planica he would go on to win a silver medal, in the individual competition at the Ski Flying World Championships, and a gold medal in the team competition. The last double header of 2020 would see Granerud win both competitions in Engelberg, making him the first Norwegian to win five World Cup competitions in a row. At the Four Hills Tournament, Granerud finished fourth overall. He also took his first podium in the Four Hills by finishing second in the new year's competition in Garmisch-Partenkirchen.

The first win of 2021 would come in Titisee-Neustadt, where Granerud won the Sunday competition. At the last weekend of January, Granerud won both competitions at Willingen. He won the Willingen Six, with 41 points to countryman Daniel Andre Tande. The following weekend, Granerud would win both competitions in Klingenthal, therefore extending his lead to over 400 points in the overall World Cup. He would win a week later in Zakopane, and was announced the winner of the overall World Cup on 4 March, due to some competitions being cancelled.

2021/22 World Cup
In the first competition of the season, Granerud finished third. The following day, Halvor would win his first competition of the season.

2023/23 World Cup 
On 1 January, Granerud won his first New Years competition at Garmisch-Partenkirchen. With a continuous form, and by winning three of the four competitions, Granerud won the Overall Four Hills Tournament.

Personal life
Granerud's great-grandfather was Norwegian children's writer Thorbjørn Egner.

Record

FIS World Nordic Ski Championships

FIS Ski Flying World Championships

World Cup

Standings

Wins

Individual starts (130)

Podiums

References

External links
 
 

1996 births
Living people
Skiers from Oslo
Norwegian male ski jumpers
FIS Nordic World Ski Championships medalists in ski jumping
Ski jumpers at the 2022 Winter Olympics
Olympic ski jumpers of Norway
21st-century Norwegian people